José Fontana (19 March 1912 – 3 April 1986), commonly known as Rei, was a Brazilian soccer player, who played as goalkeeper.

Career 
Rei began his career with Coritiba Foot Ball Club, but his good play took him to Vasco da Gama, where he replaced Jaguaré Bezerra de Vasconcelos when the latter went to FC Barcelona.

Rei got his nickname from his impeccable style of dressing, and was seen as a ladies' man, having lived with the famous singer Aracy de Almeida for four years.

Rei made his debut for the Brazil national football team in 1936.

Titles 
 Coritiba
 Campeonato Paranaense: 1931

 Vasco da Gama
 Campeonato Carioca: 1934 and 1936.

References 

Brazil international footballers
Brazilian footballers
CR Vasco da Gama players
Coritiba Foot Ball Club players
1912 births
1986 deaths

Association football goalkeepers